Lansing USD 469 is a public unified school district headquartered in Lansing, Kansas, United States.  It is in Leavenworth County in the northeastern portion of the state, part of the Kansas City Metropolitan Area.

Administration
USD 469 is currently under the leadership of Superintendent Dan Wessel.

Board of education
The Lansing board of education meets on the second Monday of every month at 7 pm at the District Office. Documents for board meetings can be found at this link on the Thursday prior to the board meeting. https://www.boarddocs.com/ks/usd469/Board.nsf/Public

Schools
The school district operates the following schools:
 Lansing High School (9-12)
 Lansing Middle School (6-8)
 Lansing Intermediate School (4-5)
 Lansing Elementary School (K-3)

See also
 Kansas State Department of Education
 Kansas State High School Activities Association
 List of high schools in Kansas
 List of unified school districts in Kansas

References

External links
 

School districts in Kansas
Education in Leavenworth County, Kansas
School districts established in 1989
1989 establishments in Kansas